Rusden surname of the following:

Francis Rusden (1811–1887), Australian politician and pastoralist, brother of  Henry, George William and Thomas Rusden

George William Rusden (1819–1903), English-Australian historian, brother of Francis, Henry and Thomas Rusden

Henry Rusden, Australian public servant, brother of Francis, George William and Thomas Rusden

Moses Rusden, 17th century English author of A Further Discovery of the Bee

Thomas Rusden (1817–1882), Australian politician and pastoralist, brother of Francis, George William and Henry Rusden